is a town located in Miyaki District, Saga Prefecture, Japan. As of March 1, 2017, the town has an estimated population of 9.589.

Geography
There is a lot of flat land in Kamimine as the town area consists largely of the Saga Plains. However, the northern part of town contains Mt. Chinzei.

Adjoining municipalities
Miyaki
Yoshinogari

History
April 1, 1889 – The modern municipal system is established. The villages of Bōsho, Emukai, Maemuta and Tsutsumi merge to form Kamimine.
November 1, 1989 – Kamimine gains town status.

Industry
The main industry in Kamimine is agriculture, particularly rice.

Education

Public schools
Kamimine Junior High School (上峰中学校)
Kamimine Elementary School (上峰小学校)

Private schools
Kamimine Kindergarten (上峰幼稚園)

Transportation

Air
The closest airports are Saga Airport and Fukuoka Airport.

Rail
The Nagasaki Main Line runs through Kamimine, but there are no stations within the town borders. The closest station is Yoshinogari-kōen Station in neighboring Yoshinogari.

Road
Expressways: The Nagasaki Expressway runs through Kamimine, but there are no interchanges within the town borders. The closest interchange is the Higashisefuri Interchange in neighboring Yoshinogari.
National highways: Route 34
Main prefectural roads: Kitashigeyasu-Mitagawa Route 22

References

External links

 Kamimine official website

Towns in Saga Prefecture